Die Wildente (English: The Wild Duck) is a 1976 German-Austrian feature film based on the play The Wild Duck by Henrik Ibsen. Bruno Ganz played the leading role under the direction of Hans W. Geißendörfer.

Cast
 Bruno Ganz as Gregers Werle
 Jean Seberg as Gina Ekdal
 Peter Kern as Hjalmar Ekdal
  as Hedvig Ekdal
 Heinz Bennent as Dr. Relling
  as Old Ekdal
 Heinz Moog as Håkon Werle
 Sonja Sutter as Mrs. Sørby

References

External links
 

1976 films